Armadale is a novel by Wilkie Collins, first published in 1864–66. It is the third of his four 'great novels' of the 1860s: after The Woman in White (1859–60) and No Name (1862), and before The Moonstone (1868).

Plot summary
In the German spa town of Wildbad, the 'Scotchman' Mr. Neal is asked to transcribe the deathbed confession of Allan Armadale; his story concerns his murder of the man he had disinherited (also called Allan Armadale), who had subsequently married the woman he was betrothed to under false pretensions. Under Allan's instructions, the confession is left to be opened by his son once he comes of age.

Nineteen years later, the son of the murdered man, also Allan Armadale, rescues a man of his own age, Ozias Midwinter. The stranger reveals himself to Reverend Decimus Brock, a friend of Allan through his late mother, as another Allan Armadale (the son of the man who committed the murder). Ozias tells Decimus of his desperate upbringing, having run away from his mother and stepfather (Mr. Neal). The Reverend promises not to disclose their relation to one another, and the young men become close companions. Ozias remains haunted by a fear that he will harm Allan as a result of their proximity, a fate warned of in his father's letter; this feeling intensifies when the pair spend a night on a shipwreck off the Isle of Man—as it turns out, the very ship on which the murder was committed. Also on the vessel, Allan has a mysterious dream involving three characters; Ozias believes that the events are a prophecy of the future.

Three members of Allan's family die in mysterious circumstances, one of which was instigated with the rescue of a woman who attempted to commit suicide by drowning. As a result, Allan inherits the estate of Thorpe-Ambrose in Norfolk and relocates there with Ozias, intending to make him steward. Once there he falls in love with Eleanor (Neelie) Milroy, the sixteen-year-old daughter of Major Milroy, to whom he has rented a cottage. During this time, correspondence takes place between Maria Oldershaw and Lydia Gwilt concerning the latter's ambitions to marry Allan as a means of achieving retribution for his family's apparent wrongdoings (she was originally a maid in the service of his mother).

Lydia, who is thirty-five but looks twenty-something, is the villain of the novel and her colourful portrayal takes up much of the rest of the story. Originally Allan's mother's maid, and a contributor to the conflict between Allan and Ozias's fathers, she is a fortune hunter and, it turns out, a murderess. Unable to alienate Allan's affections from Miss Milroy, she settles for marrying Midwinter, having discovered his name is the same. She plots to murder Allan, or have him killed by her ex-lover, a Cuban desperado and, since she is now "Mrs. Armadale," to impersonate his widow. Allan escapes the desperado's attempt on his life—he is supposed to have drowned in a shipwreck—and returns to England. Lydia's plans are thus foiled. Her last shot is to murder Allan herself—the weapon being poison gas, the scene being a sanatorium run by a quack called Doctor Downward—but she is thwarted by her own conscience. Midwinter and Allan have switched rooms, and she can't bring herself to murder her true husband, for whom she does have genuine feelings of love. After rescuing Midwinter and writing him a farewell note, she goes into the air-poisoned room and kills herself. Allan marries Miss Milroy; Midwinter, still his best friend, becomes a writer.

Some linking passages consist of letters between the various characters, or of extracts from Lydia's journal, but the great majority of the text narrates the events as they occur. The novel is enlivened by many minor characters including Mr Bashwood, an old failure of a clerk who is infatuated with the beautiful Lydia; his son, James 'Jemmy' Bashwood, a private detective; Mrs Oldershaw, an unscrupulous associate of Lydia's; the Pedgifts (father and son), Allan's lawyers; and the Rev Decimus Brock, a shrewd (but not quite shrewd enough) clergyman who brings Allan up but who is kept out of the way for much of the book.

Analysis
The question of whether the story is to be interpreted rationally or superstitiously, as Midwinter does, is never resolved.
				
Catherine Peters writes in an introduction to the book that "The distortions of the plot, the violent and irrational reactions of the characters, reflect and dramatise the ways in which his readers’ perceptions were distorted by the assumptions and hypocrisies of the society in which they lived."

Adaptations
In the same year that it finished its serial publication, Collins wrote a dramatic version of Armadale in order to protect his rights to later stage the novel.

A play by Jeffrey Hatcher based on the novel premiered on 23 April 2008 at the Milwaukee Repertory Theater.

BBC Radio 4 broadcast a three-part adaptation by Robin Brooks of the novel between Sunday 7 and Sunday 21 June 2009. The cast was Lydia, Lucy Robinson; Allan, Alex Robertson; Midwinter, Ray Fearon; Neelie, Perdita Avery; Bashwood, Richard Durden; Downward, Geoffrey Whitehead; James 'Jemmy' Bashwood, Grant Gillespie; Vincent, Robin Brooks.

In this adaptation, Lydia Gwilt is the narrator, and her character is emphasised rather than Midwinter's forebodings.

Characters 
Allan Armadale
Ozias Midwinter (legal name Allan Armadale) – His friend
Lydia Gwilt – Forger and laudanum addict, the anti-heroine of the novel
The Reverend Decimus Brock – A minister and friend of Alan Armadale and Ozias Midwinter. He is a correspondent of Ozias Midwinter and privy to his secret
Mrs Maria Oldershaw – owner of the Ladies' Toilet Repository and Lydia Gwilt's co-conspirator
Allan Armadale (1st) – Father of Allan Armadale (2nd)
Allan Armadale (2nd) alias Fergus Ingleby – Son of Allan Armadale (1st) and father of the main character Allan Armadale
Allan Armadale (3rd) (formerly Allan Wrentmore) – Father of Ozias Midwinter and murderer of Allan Armadale (2nd)
Mr. Neal – Stepfather to Ozias Midwinter
Mr. Bashwood; Lydia Gwilt's admirer and Allan Armadale's steward
Miss Eleanor (Neelie) Milroy – Resident of Thorpe-Ambrose and neighbour to Allan Armadale, later to be Armadale's fiancée
Augustus Pedgift, Sr. – lawyer and adviser to Allan Armadale
Augustus Pedgift, Jr. – Pedgift's son, a junior lawyer and friend to Allan Armadale
Dr. Downward – criminal associate of Mrs. Oldershaw, later the founder & operator of Friendvale Sanatorium under the alias Dr. Le Doux
Captain Manuel – one of Lydia Gwilt's former lovers

Publication history
Armadale first appeared as a serialisation in the Cornhill Magazine, issued in twenty monthly instalments from November 1864 to June 1866. It was serialised almost concurrently in the United States, appearing in Harper's New Monthly Magazine between December 1864 and July 1866. It first appeared in book form as a two volume literary edition in May 1866.

External links

 
 

1866 British novels
British mystery novels
British novels adapted into plays
Novels by Wilkie Collins
Novels first published in serial form
Novels set in Germany
Novels set in Norfolk
Works originally published in The Cornhill Magazine